Christopher Fisher (born 2 October 1949) is an Australian middle-distance runner. He competed in the men's 1500 metres at the 1972 Summer Olympics. Fisher also competed in the men's 800 metres and men's 1500 metres at the  1970 British Commonwealth Games.

References

External links
 
 

1949 births
Living people
Australian male middle-distance runners
Olympic athletes of Australia
Athletes (track and field) at the 1972 Summer Olympics
Commonwealth Games competitors for Australia
Athletes (track and field) at the 1970 British Commonwealth Games
Place of birth missing (living people)
20th-century Australian people
21st-century Australian people